Dichomeris elegans is a moth in the family Gelechiidae. It was described by Kyu-Tek Park in 2001. It is found in Taiwan.

The length of the forewings is 9-9.5 mm. The forewings are greyish brown with scattered dark brown scales and dark brown costal spot. The hindwings are grey.

References

Moths described in 2001
elegans